Carolina Miranda Calleja, better known as Carol Miranda, is a retired Spanish football midfielder and the current manager of the women's team of Valencia CF.

Playing career
Miranda played for SD Lagunak, CE Sabadell, RCD Espanyol and several Catalan teams in the Spanish Primera División.

Managerial career
On 15 April 2019, Miranda was appointed as head coach of women's Valencia, where she was assistant coach until the sack of Óscar Suárez.

After her first experience as head coach, she remained in the club as director of football. She came back to the bench of Valencia on 2 February 2020, as caretaker coach after the dismissal of Irene Ferreras. She only managed the team in the 2–7 Copa de la Reina loss against Deportivo La Coruña.

Titles
 1 Spanish League (2006)
 3 Spanish Cups (2003, 2006, 2009)

References

External links
Profile at Txapeldunak

1982 births
Living people
Spanish women's footballers
Primera División (women) players
CE Sabadell Femení players
RCD Espanyol Femenino players
Women's association football midfielders
Spanish football managers
Footballers from Pamplona
SD Lagunak (women) players
CE Sant Gabriel players
FC Levante Las Planas players
Primera División (women) managers
Valencia CF Femenino managers